Naomi McDuffie, also known as Powerhouse, is a fictional superhero appearing in comic books published by DC Comics, as well as a television drama by The CW. The character was created by the writer Brian Michael Bendis for his Wonder Comics imprint, along with writer David F. Walker, and artist Jamal Campbell. The character's name is, in part, a tribute to comic book writer and creator Dwayne McDuffie.

The character made her live-action debut in The CW's eponymous series, and was portrayed by Kaci Walfall.

Publication history
The character Naomi McDuffie was created by writers Brian Michael Bendis and David F. Walker, with artwork by Jamal Campbell. The character's surname of McDuffie was given as a tribute to the late comic book creator Dwayne McDuffie, whose own writing career focused on underrepresented minorities in American comics.

Fictional character biography

Origin
In an alternate universe in the DC Multiverse, the degradation of Earth's ozone layer exposes the surface of the Earth to a previously-unknown type of radioactive energy, causing 29 people from around the planet to develop godlike powers. Some of these people attempt world domination with their new powers, while others oppose this, leading to a cataclysmic war between these metahumans. One month later, fourteen of the metahumans have died, and seven others have left the planet, leaving only eight remaining. Naomi is the first child born to two of these metahumans. The most evil of the original 29 metahumans, a criminal named Zumbado, who was about to be executed when he got his powers, tries to kill the infant Naomi. Consequently, her parents send her to Earth-0 for her safety and are killed in battle doing so. The infant ends up in a small Oregon town, where a Rannian ex-soldier and resident of the town, going by the name Greg McDuffie, witnesses her arrival, and adopts her.

Naomi lives an ordinary life in her hometown raised by Greg and his human wife, who knows about her husband's secrets, until Superman crashes through the center of town in a battle with Mongul. This prompts a couple of citizens to talk about the previous time the town had an encounter with otherworldly beings. Having learned that the date of the incident was also the day she was adopted, Naomi questions whether she has a connection to superheroes and begins looking into her origins.

Greg then reveals his own origins to Naomi, before telling her about her arrival on Earth-0. He gives Naomi a device he found with her, which contains a message from her birth mother, and awakens her superpowers. Shortly afterward, Zumbado arrives and takes Naomi back to their original world, which has been devastated under his rule. Naomi fights Zumbado to avenge her birth parents, and only narrowly manages to escape back to Earth-0.

Following these events, Naomi flies to Metropolis, and meets Superman and Batman. She later joins the recently reformed Young Justice.

Infinite Frontier
Following the events of Dark Nights: Death Metal, Naomi joins the Justice League.

Powers, abilities, and equipment
In the comics, Naomi has a tremendous amount of an unknown type of energy inside her body. She can fire powerful energy blasts from her hands. This energy makes her very strong and durable, and allows her to fly. She can also manifest a black and gold costume around her body.

In other media

In December 2020, a live-action television series based on the character was announced to be in development by The CW. Kaci Walfall was cast as Naomi McDuffie in March 2021. In May, The CW put the series to order. This version of Naomi is initially a Superman fangirl living in the real world, who is slowly drawn into the DC Universe as she develops superpowers. On May 12, 2022, The CW canceled the series after one season.

References

External links
 DC Database

 DC Comics characters with superhuman strength
 Comics characters introduced in 2019
 Fictional characters with energy-manipulation abilities
 DC Comics superheroes
 DC Comics metahumans
 Teenage characters in comics
 Characters created by Brian Michael Bendis
 Fictional characters from parallel universes
 Superheroes who are adopted
 Fictional refugees
 Black people in comics
 African-American superheroes
 DC Comics female superheroes